Club de Futbol Joventut Mollerussa is a football team based in Mollerussa in the autonomous community of Catalonia. Founded in 1930, it plays in the Primera Catalana – Group 2. Its stadium is Camp Municipal with a capacity of 4,000 seats.

Season to season

1 season in Segunda División
4 seasons in Segunda División B
4 seasons in Tercera División

Players

Current squad

Famous players
 Bojan Krkić
 Antonio Pantoja
 Xavier Horcajada

Famous coaches
 Lluís Pujol

External links
Official website

Football clubs in Catalonia
Association football clubs established in 1930
Divisiones Regionales de Fútbol clubs
Pla d'Urgell
1930 establishments in Spain
Segunda División clubs